LOSE is the third studio album by the American indie rock band Cymbals Eat Guitars, released by Tough Love Records on August 25, 2014 in the UK and by Barsuk Records on August 26, 2014 in the U.S.

Track listing

References

2014 albums
Barsuk Records albums
Albums produced by John Agnello